Christina Bernardi (born 7 June 1990) is an Australian rules footballer who plays for the Carlton Football Club in the AFL Women's competition (AFLW). Bernadi was drafted by Collingwood in 2017 and was selected in the 2018 AFL Women's All-Australian team and was Collingwood's leading goalkicker in 2018.

Early life
Bernardi was introduced to football by future teammate and captain Steph Chiocci, after they met at RMIT University where they studied teaching, and played for the RMIT Redbacks. She joined VFLW club Diamond Creek in 2012. After kicking 33 goals in the 2016 season as a small forward, she missed the grand final against Darebin Falcons due to having committed to a volunteering trip in South Africa.

AFL Women's career

Collingwood (2017–2018)
In October 2016, Bernardi was drafted by Collingwood, joining 13 other players from Diamond Creek who were drafted to AFLW clubs. She made her debut in round 1, 2017, in the inaugural AFLW match at IKON Park against .

Collingwood re-signed Bernardi for the 2018 season during the trade period in May 2017.

Greater Western Sydney (2019)
Ahead of the 2019 season, Bernardi was traded to Greater Western Sydney as part of a 5-way deal, including Talia Radan and 12 picks.

Richmond (2020–2022)
Bernardi joined Richmond in the expansion club signing period in April 2019. In May 2022, she was delisted by Richmond.

Carlton (2022-)
On 22 September 2022, Bernardi was added to Carlton's list after a long injury list meant the club wouldn't have been able to field a 24-person squad

On 23 September 2022, Bernardi was selected in the team to debut in Round 5 against Melbourne.

On 13 March 2023, Bernardi was announced as the VFLW captain for 2023.

Statistics
Statistics are correct to the end of the 2021 season.

|- style="background:#eaeaea"
| scope="row" text-align:center | 2017
| 
| 6 || 6 || 2 || 3 || 35 || 7 || 42 || 13 || 7 || 0.3 || 0.5 || 5.8 || 1.2 || 7.0 || 2.2 || 1.2
|-
| scope="row" text-align:center | 2018
| 
| 6 || 7 || 9 || 3 || 67 || 13 || 80 || 30 || 15 || 1.3 || 0.4 || 9.6 || 1.9 || 11.4 || 4.3 || 2.1
|- style="background:#eaeaea"
| scope="row" text-align:center | 2019
| 
| 4 || 7 || 7 || 6 || 44 || 15 || 59 || 15 || 15 || 1.0 || 0.9 || 6.3 || 2.1 || 8.4 || 2.1 || 2.1
|- 
| scope="row" text-align:center | 2020
| 
| 6 || 6 || 3 || 6 || 33 || 13 || 46 || 10 || 10 || 0.5 || 1.0 || 5.5 || 2.2 || 7.7 || 1.7 || 1.7
|- style="background:#eaeaea"
| scope="row" text-align:center | 2021
| 
| 6 || 6 || 4 || 1 || 29 || 11 || 40 || 9 || 21 || 0.7 || 0.2 || 4.8 || 1.8 || 6.7 || 1.5 || 3.5
|- style="background:#eaeaea; font-weight:bold; width:2em"
| scope="row" text-align:center class="sortbottom" colspan=3 | Career
| 32
| 25
| 20
| 208
| 59
| 267
| 77
| 68
| 0.8
| 0.6
| 6.5
| 1.8
| 8.3
| 2.4
| 2.1
|}

Personal life
Outside of football, Bernardi is a physical education teacher at Ivanhoe Grammar School.

Honours and achievements
 Individual
 AFL Women's All-Australian team: 2018
 Collingwood leading goalkicker: 2018
 Greater Western Sydney leading goalkicker: 2019

References

External links

  
 

Living people
1990 births
Collingwood Football Club (AFLW) players
Australian rules footballers from Melbourne
Sportswomen from Victoria (Australia)
Australian schoolteachers
All-Australians (AFL Women's)
Greater Western Sydney Giants (AFLW) players
Richmond Football Club (AFLW) players
RMIT University alumni